This is a list of defunct airlines of Antigua and Barbuda.

See also

 List of airlines of Antigua and Barbuda
 List of airports in Antigua and Barbuda

References

Antigua and Barbuda
Airlines
Aviation in Antigua and Barbuda
Airlines